Por amar sin ley (English title: Laws of love) is a Mexican telenovela produced by José Alberto Castro that premiered on Las Estrellas on 12 February 2018. It is a remake of a 2016 Colombian telenovela La ley del corazón. The telenovela revolves around the personal life and work of a group of lawyers belonging to a prestigious law firm.

Executive producer José Alberto Castro has said that he does not know if he will carry out a third season of the telenovela, but he left open all the elements to continue it if Televisa decides to do it later. On 7 February 2020, producer José Alberto Castro confirmed that the series had been renewed for a third season.

Plot 
The series follows the life of a group of lawyers who work for the firm Vega y Asociados founded by Alonso Vega (Guillermo García Cantú). The main characters are Alejandra (Ana Brenda Contreras), Ricardo (David Zepeda) and Carlos (Julián Gil). After the police imprison Carlos for the death of a prostitute, Alejandra begins to work for Vega y Asociados and begins to be attracted to Ricardo, but Carlos, after seeing this, decides to do everything possible to separate them together with the help of Elena (Geraldine Bazán). On the other hand, are Victoria (Altair Jarabo) and Roberto (José María Torre Hütt ), Roberto tries to seduce her, but she refuses to fall into his game, Benjamín (Pablo Valentín) and Leticia (Eva Cedeño), two ambitious lawyers who are lovers, Olivia (Ilithya Manzanilla) who is madly in love with Leonardo (Manuel Balbi), but he only has eyes for his work, Gustavo (Sergio Basañez), who after a bad decision ends his marriage, and Juan López (Víctor García), a lawyer who admires the firm Vega y Asociados and wishes to obtain a position in that law firm.

Cast and characters 

 Ana Brenda Contreras as Alejandra Ponce, she is a lawyer in family cases.
 David Zepeda as Ricardo Bustamante, he is a senior lawyer in family cases, Elena's ex-husband.
 Julián Gil as Carlos Ibarra, he is a prestigious lawyer.
 José María Torre Hütt  as Roberto Morelli, he is an attorney lawyer of Vega y Asociado.
 Sergio Basañez as Gustavo Soto, is a lawyer for Vega and Asociados.
 Altair Jarabo as Victoria Escalante, lawyer of Vega y Asociados, she has an interest in Roberto, but does not show it.
 Guillermo García Cantú as Alonso Vega, he is the owner of the law firm Vega y Asociados.
 Pablo Valentín as Benjamín Acosta, ambitious lawyer of the company Vega Y Asociado. (season 1)
 Ilithya Manzanilla as Olivia Suárez, she is a dedicated lawyer in cases of family abuse. (season 1)
 Geraldine Bazán as Elena Fernández, ex-wife of Ricardo.
 Moisés Arizmendi as Alan Páez, Carlos cousin.
 Manuel Balbi as Leonardo Morán, lawyer of Vega y Asociado. (season 1)
 Víctor García as Juan López, independent lawyer who then starts working for Vega y Asociados.
 Eva Cedeño as Leticia Jara, junior lawyer of Vega y Asociado, Benjamin's lover. (season 1)
 Azela Robinson as Paula Ortega, Alejandra's mother.
 Roberto Ballesteros as Jaime Ponce,  Alejandra's father.
 Leticia Perdigón as Susana López, Juan's mother.
 Issabela Camil as Isabel, Gustavo's wife. (season 1)
 Arlette Pacheco as Carmen, secretary of Vega y Asociados.
 Magda Karina as Sonia, prosecutor of the public ministry. (season 1)
 Nataly Umaña as Tatiana, she is Patricia Linares friend.
 Lourdes Munguía as Lourdes, she is the best friend of Paula.
 Polly as Alicia, she is the best friend of Paula.
 Daniela Álvarez as Fer, neighbor of Juan and Susana, help Juan to do research.
 Kimberly Dos Ramos as Sofía Alcocer (guest, season 1; main, season 2)
 Marco Méndez as Javier Rivas (season 2)
 Axel Ricco as El Ciego (guest, season 1; main, season 2)
 Alejandra García as Lorena Fuentes (season 2)
 Mar Zamora as Nancy Muñoz (season 2)
 Julio Vallado as Manuel Durán (season 2)
 Mauricio Rousselon as Raúl (season 2)
 Marc Clotet as Adrián Carballo (season 2)
 Alejandro Tommasi as Nicolás (guest, season 1; main, season 2)
 Karina Ancira (season 2)
 Elías Campo as El Chivo (season 2)
 Diego Val as El Cuervo (season 2)
 Lucía Silva as Michelle (season 2)

Episodes

Production 
The start of production began on 6 November 2017, and concluded in May 2018. On 10 May 2018, Univision revealed through its upfront for the 2018-19 television season that the series renewed for a second season. The second season premiered on 3 March 2019. Filming for the second season commenced on 11 June 2018.

Ratings

Mexico ratings 
 

| link2             = List of Por amar sin ley episodes#Season 2 (2019)
| episodes2         = 88
| start2            = 
| end2              = 
| startrating2      = 3.1
| endrating2        = 2.7
| viewers2          = |2}} 
}}

U.S. ratings 
 

| link2             = List of Por amar sin ley episodes#Season 2 (2019)
| episodes2         = 84
| start2            = 
| end2              = 
| startrating2      = 1.19
| endrating2        = 1.17
| viewers2          = |2}} 
}}
Notes

Awards and nominations

References

External links 
 

2018 telenovelas
Mexican telenovelas
Televisa telenovelas
Las Estrellas original programming
2018 Mexican television series debuts
2019 Mexican television series endings
Mexican television series based on Colombian television series
Spanish-language telenovelas
Television shows set in Mexico City
Television shows set in Cancún
Television shows set in Los Angeles
Television shows set in New York City